Daniel Hunter may refer to:

 Daniel Hunter (musician), founder of Analog Rebellion
 Daniel Hunter (volleyball) (born 1990), British volleyball player
 Daniel Hunter (swimmer), New Zealand swimmer

See also
Danielle Hunter, American football player
 Dan Hunter (disambiguation)